Pawel Bartoszek (born 25 September 1980) is an Icelandic politician. In 2010 he was elected in the Constitutional Assembly election. In the 2016 Icelandic parliamentary election, he was elected as a Member of the Althing, representing Viðreisn. In the 2018 Icelandic municipal elections, he was elected to the Reykjavík City Council. Bartoszek holds a master's degree in mathematics from the University of Iceland.

References

Pawel Bartoszek
Living people
1980 births
Pawel Bartoszek
Pawel Bartoszek
Pawel Bartoszek
Pawel Bartoszek
Politicians from Poznań
University of Iceland alumni